Won by a Head is a 1920 British silent sports film directed by Percy Nash and starring Rex Davis, Frank Tennant and Vera Cornish. It was set in the horseracing world.

Cast
 Rex Davis as Chester Lawton 
 Frank Tennant as Milton Bell 
 Vera Cornish as Phyllis Reid 
 Wallace Bosco as Jim Kort 
 Douglas Payne   
 J. Edwards Barker   
 Madge Tree

References

External links

1920 films
1920s sports films
British silent feature films
British horse racing films
Films directed by Percy Nash
British black-and-white films
1920s English-language films
1920s British films
Silent sports films